Sharifah Aryana binti Syed Zainal Rashid Al-Yahya (born 21 April 1995), better known by her stage name Sharifah Aryana, is a Malaysian actress. Sharifah is of Arab-Chinese-Bengali parentage.

She is the youngest daughter with two elder sisters both are also actresses in the Malaysian entertainment scene, one is Sharifah Amani. She's now a Sunway University student and is pursuing a Diploma in Performing Arts.

Filmography

Film

Television

References

External links

1986 births
Living people
People from Kuala Lumpur
21st-century Malaysian actresses
Malaysian people of Malay descent
Malaysian people of Arab descent
Malaysian Muslims
Malaysian film actresses
Malaysian child actresses
Malaysian people of Chinese descent
Malaysian people of Bengali descent